Clidoderma is a genus of righteye flounders containing one extant species and two described fossil species from Japan.

Fossil species 
Two fossil species are known from the Miocene of Japan.  C. chitaensis Ohe & Kawase 1995 is known from the Yamami formation of the Chita Peninsula and C. yamagataensis Sakamoto, Uyeno & Otsu 2001 known from Yamagata Prefecture.

Extant species 
There is currently one recognized extant species in this genus:
 Clidoderma asperrimum (Temminck & Schlegel, 1846) (Roughscale sole)

See also 

 Prehistoric fish
 List of prehistoric bony fish

References 

Prehistoric ray-finned fish genera
Extinct animals of Japan
Marine fish genera
Taxa named by Pieter Bleeker